Dave MacKenzie is a retired Scottish-Canadian soccer defender who played professionally in the Major Indoor Soccer League.

Professional
MacKenzie attended Colgate University where he played both hockey and soccer.  He was inducted into the school's Athletic Hall of Fame.  In 1978, he began his professional career with the Pittsburgh Spirit of the Major Indoor Soccer League.  In 1980, he moved to the Hartford Hellions for one season before rejoining the Spirit in 1981.  He remained with the Spirit until 1985 when he signed with the Baltimore Blast.  In 1988, he was hired to coach the Fort Wayne Flames of the American Indoor Soccer Association.  After his retirement from professional soccer in 1989, MacKenzie remained in the Pittsburgh area where he played for the amateur Pittsburgh Beadling.

National team
In 1974, MacKenzie played four games for the Canadian U-20 soccer team.  In 1974, he played one qualification game with the Canadian Olympic soccer team IN 1979.

References

External links
 MISL stats
 National team stats

1956 births
American Indoor Soccer Association coaches
American Indoor Soccer Association players
Baltimore Blast (1980–1992) players
Canadian ice hockey players
Canadian soccer players
Colgate Raiders men's ice hockey players
Fort Wayne Flames players
Hartford Hellions players
Living people
Major Indoor Soccer League (1978–1992) players
Pittsburgh Beadling players
Pittsburgh Spirit players
Association football defenders
Canadian soccer coaches